India competed in seven events at the 1988 Summer Olympics in Seoul, South Korea, winning no medals.

Competitors
The following is the list of number of competitors in the Games.

Results by event

Archery

In India's first appearance in Olympic archery, the nation was represented by three men.

Men

Athletics

Women

Track events

Boxing

Hockey

The results of the Indian olympic field hockey teams are as follows:

Men's team competition

Team Roster
 Maneypandu Somaya (captain)
 Rajinder Singh (goalkeeper)
 Pargat Singh
 Ashok Kumar
 Mohinder Pal Singh
 Vivek Singh
 Sujit Kumar
 Subrami Balanda Kalaiash
 Mohammed Shahid
 Sebastian Jude Felix
 Balwinder Singh
 Mervyn Fernandis
 Thoiba Singh
 Gundeep Kumar
 Jagbir Singh
 Mark Patterson (goalkeeper)
Head coach: Ganbash Mollera Poovaiah

Preliminary round
Group B

Classification round
5-8th Place Play-off

5th Place Play-off

Swimming

Men

Table Tennis

Tennis

References

Nations at the 1988 Summer Olympics
1988